Stor-Age, or Stor-Age Property REIT Limited, is a South African public company based in Cape Town. The company is a real estate investment trust that owns, acquires, develops and manages self-storage assets in metropolitan areas across South Africa and the United Kingdom. Stor-Age is the largest self-storage property fund in South Africa and has been listed on the Johannesburg Stock Exchange since 2015. The company currently has 86 self-storage properties located across South Africa and the UK.

History
Stor-Age was founded in 2004 to fill a vacuum in self-storage facilities in the greater metropolitan areas of South Africa. Gavin Lucas, the current CEO of Stor-Age, who was certified as a CA at the University of Cape Town, began working with his father, Les Lucas, his brother, Stephen Lucas, and fellow accountant, Steven Horton, to build a real estate investment trust. The four set up a "hotel pool rental scheme", raising R10 million by selling 200 units valued at R50,000 each. In 2007, they conducted extensive market research and secured a site in Edgemead, Cape Town. By 2013 they had 33 properties, 17 trading stores, eight greenfield sites and eight acquisitions. By 2015, Stor-Age controlled 40 properties with a total value of R2 billion.

On 16 November 2015, Stor-Age became South Africa's first self-storage property fund to be listed on the JSE's main board. Between September 2015 and September 2017, the company's market capitalisation tripled to reach approximately R3.5 billion, its annual revenue increased by 43% to R124 million and its annual operating profits increased by 50% to R84.5 million. However, as Business Day noted, South Africa's macroeconomic conditions are at least partially responsible for these rapid gains as self-storage conditions usually thrive in poor economic conditions since many people have to downsize or keep goods in storage before selling them.

In 2018, Stor-Age owned 50 properties in South Africa and the UK with a total value of R3.9 billion (R2.5bn in South Africa and R1.4bn in the UK). In early 2018, Stor-Age also performed unusually well amongst real-estate stocks on the JSE having 4% growth in the first few months of 2018, while the overall returns from real-estate sector declined by 18.56%.

In March 2019, the Stor-Age portfolio experienced a 63% growth in rental income, declaring a total dividend of 107 cents per share despite unstable economic conditions in South Africa as well as in the UK due to Brexit. During the year, the group also invested R850 million in new developments in South Africa as part of their new growth and investment strategy.

In September 2019, Stor-Age launched ‘Management 1st’ in the UK, a third-party management solution offered to independent operators, developers and private equity owners. This also included the development of the full-service digital marketing agency, Digital First. As a sub-component of their third-party management platform, the agency provided the group with an alternative revenue stream by generating enquiries and growing an online presence for independent self-storage operators. 

In March 2020, Stor-Age entered into a joint venture with UK real estate fund manager, Moorfield Group, to build a self-storage portfolio worth R1.1 billion (£50 million) and develop self-storage assets in London and South East England. During the year, the group also concluded the acquisition of the Craighall property in Johannesburg, South Africa and the five-property Flexi Store portfolio in the UK, growing the portfolio to 71 properties. 

Following the economic instability brought on by the COVID-19 pandemic in 2020, the property fund experienced an increase in demand as a result of homeowners downscaling, the adoption of remote working, and a rise in e-commerce businesses. Between 31 March 2020 and 31 March 2021, the group had a growth in organic rental income of 8.6% and 6.3% in South Africa and the UK respectively, ending the financial year with 74 properties and a total property value of R7.6 billion.  This rise in demand also increased Stor-Age’s interim dividend by 8.85% to 56.60 cents per share in the first six months after the release of their annual financial results in March.

In September 2021, Stor-Age entered into a joint venture with Nedbank Corporate and Investment Bank to develop two properties in Morningside and Bryanston in South Africa's Gauteng province, at an aggregated cost of approximately R200 million. The group completed a further 11 acquisitions (two properties in South Africa and nine in the UK) from 31 March 2021 to 31 March 2022, increasing their portfolio to 85 properties and their total property value to R10.2 billion.

In September 2022, Stor-Age announced its secondary listing on the alternative South African stock exchange, A2X Markets.

Acquisitions
In September 2016, Stor-Age acquired Storage RSA, which owned seven properties at the time of its acquisition (four in Cape Town and three in Gauteng). This was part of Stor-Age's strategy which was to seek a consolidation of the South African storage industry to potentially enhance their portfolio over time through digital marketing and revenue management initiatives.

In September 2017, it acquired Storage King, a U.K.-based self-storage company, to gain a foothold in the British market. In November, Stor-Age then acquired StorTown, the largest self-storage facility in KwaZulu-Natal for R1.45 billion. This sale included four properties located in Brackenhill, Durban CBD and Durban North and increased the company's Gross Lettable Area (GLA) by over 9%.

Stor-Age further expanded its operations in Cape Town by purchasing All-Store Self Storage for R52 million. This acquisition included properties in Bellville, Kuils River, and Brackenfell, which are suburbs north of Cape Town. Lucas approached All-Storage Self Storage and expressed an interest in buying them out since 2011.

In March 2019, Stor-Age acquired UK-based trading properties Viking Self Storage in Bedford and The Storage Pod in Surrey. In December, Stor-Age purchased the five-property Flexi Store portfolio, which comprised properties in Dudley, Nottingham, Shrewsbury, Warrington and West Bromwich. The acquisition increased the total number of owner operated UK Storage King facilities to 21, ranking them as the sixth largest self-storage company in the UK.

From 31 March 2021 to 31 March 2022, Stor-Age completed 11 acquisitions, increasing their South African portfolio by two properties and their UK portfolio by nine. The South African acquisitions included Silver Park Self Storage in Cape Town’s northern suburbs and Green Cube Self Storage in the southern suburbs. [36] The acquisitions in the UK included the largest self-storage property in Blackpool, Blackpool Self Store, which was acquired for £3.6 million, the four-property McCarthy’s portfolio acquired in January 2022 as part of the joint venture with the Moorfield Group, and the four-property Storagebase portfolio purchased for £59 million in March 2022. Think Self Storage, located in Parklands, a suburb on Cape Town’s west coast, was purchased for R65 million in November 2022, increasing the group’s portfolio to 86 self-storage properties across South Africa and the UK.

Water storage
During the Cape Town water crisis, Stor-Age ran a water saving campaign where it volunteered its storage facilities for conserving water. Cape Town residents were invited to donate store-bought, five-liter bottles of water to Stor-Age's facilities.

References

External links
 

Companies based in Cape Town
Companies listed on the Johannesburg Stock Exchange
Real estate investment trusts
Storage companies